Hijack is the eighth studio album by Amon Düül II. It was released in 1974 by Atlantic Records. It was distributed in the UK by WEA Records.

Track listing

Personnel
Amon Düül II
Renate Knaup — vocals
Chris Karrer — guitars, violin, vocals, tenor saxophone
John Weinzierl — guitars
Falk Rogner – synthesizer
Lothar Meid — bass, guitar, vocals, string arrangements
Peter Leopold - drums, percussion, acoustic guitar

Additional Personnel
Chris Balder — strings
Ludwig Popp — French horn
Lee Harper — trumpet
Bob Chatwin — trumpet
Bobby Jones — saxophone
Rudy Nagora — saxophone
Thor Baldursson — keyboards
Olaf Kubler — flute, soprano saxophone
Herman Jalowitzki — marching drum
Wild Willy — accordion, percussion, vocals

References

Amon Düül II albums
1974 albums